Give Me the Fear is the debut album of Tokyo Dragons. The track "Teenage Screamers" was featured in the 2006 racing game FlatOut

Track listing
 "What the Hell" – 3:47
 "Get 'Em Off" – 2:57
 "Do You Wanna?" – 3:36
 "Come On Baby" – 3:56
 "Let It Go" – 3:36
 "Johnny Don't Wanna Ride" – 2:54
 "Teenage Screamers" – 3:43
 "Ready Or Not" – 4:44
 "Burn On" – 2:55
 "Rockin' The Stew" – 3:17
 "Chasing The Night" – 4:55

Singles

The song "Teenage Screamers" was used in 2004 video game Flatout.

Personnel
 Steve Lomax – rhythm/lead guitars, lead vocals
 Mal Bruk – lead/rhythm guitars,  backing vocals
 Ade Easily – bass 
 Phil Martini – drums, backing vocals

2005 debut albums
Tokyo Dragons albums
Albums recorded at Rockfield Studios